The olivaceous woodcreeper (Sittasomus griseicapillus) is a passerine bird of the tropical Americas. It belongs to the true woodcreepers (tribe Dendrocolaptini) of the ovenbird family (Furnariidae).

It is the only member of the genus Sittasomus, but includes 15 vocally and morphologically distinct subspecies in 5 groups, some of which are candidates for a future split.

Description
The head, upper back and underparts are lighter or darker greyish olive, and the wings, tail and lower back are light rufous. The bill is short and thin.

The normal call is a fast, high-pitched trill wu-wu-wu-we-we-we-we-ee-ee-ee-ee-we-we-we-we, but this varies geographically.

Distribution and habitat
It breeds from southern Mexico through tropical Central and South America to northern Argentina and Uruguay, and also on Tobago. The species is found throughout the Amazon basin, but is absent from its lowest reaches, including much of the adjacent Guyanas.

There, the subspecies of the northeastern Amazon (S. g. axillaris) ranges at least to the Pakaraima Mountains, where it is fairly common at  ASL, descending to about  ASL on occasion. The olivaceous woodcreeper has also been recorded from extreme southern Guyana and the Essequibo River (which may be its eastern limit in the region). It is apparently completely absent from eastern Guyana eastwards through Suriname and French Guiana.

In Uruguay, the olivaceous woodcreeper was found for the first time in 1997 in the gallery forests of the Yaguarón River, in Cerro Largo Department. Since then, it has also been recorded near Cuchilla de Mangrullo, as well as in the Sierra de los Ríos.

Behaviour and ecology
The olivaceous woodcreeper is a common and widespread bird of forests and other woodlands. It feeds on insects and spiders. It normally forages on tree trunks or large branches or on the ground, usually singly.

These birds may associate with foraging groups of golden lion tamarins (Leontopithecus rosalia) to snatch prey startled by the monkeys. They can also be occasionally seen catching flying prey like termites in mid-air, and will sometimes join mixed-species feeding flocks. In some places (e.g. in the Serra de Paranapiacaba of Brazil), they may even form a core species of such flocks.

It builds a nest lined with dead leaves in a tree hole and lays three white eggs.

Due to its extremely wide range, the olivaceous woodcreeper is not considered a threatened species by the IUCN.

Notes

References

Further reading

External links

 
 Photo at John Kormendy's Birds of Brazil photo gallery
 
 

olivaceous woodcreeper
olivaceous woodcreeper
Birds of Mexico
Birds of the Yucatán Peninsula
Birds of the Amazon Basin
Birds of Colombia
Birds of Venezuela
Birds of Ecuador
Birds of Bolivia
Birds of Paraguay
Birds of Brazil
Birds of the Guianas
Birds of Trinidad and Tobago
olivaceous woodcreeper
olivaceous woodcreeper